Yirrell Beach is a main beach of Winthrop, Massachusetts.  The southern part is also known as Point Shirley Beach, as the neighborhood is Point Shirley. Farther north is Winthrop Beach, Short Beach and eventually Revere Beach in Revere.

The beach is home to Winthrop's Sandcastle Festival in June and the Old Fashioned Family Day at the Beach in July.

References

Winthrop, Massachusetts
Beaches of Massachusetts
Landforms of Suffolk County, Massachusetts
Tourist attractions in Suffolk County, Massachusetts